The final of the Women's discus throw event at the 2002 European Championships in Munich, Germany was held on August 7, 2002. There were a total number of 18 participating athletes. The qualifying rounds were staged a day earlier, on August 6, with the mark set at 62.00 metres.

Medalists

Abbreviations
All results shown are in metres

Records

Qualification

Final

See also
 2000 Women's Olympic Discus Throw (Sydney)
 2001 Women's World Championships Discus Throw (Edmonton)
 2003 Women's World Championships Discus Throw (Paris)
 2004 Women's Olympic Discus Throw (Athens)

References
 Results
 todor66
 athletix

Discus throw
Discus throw at the European Athletics Championships
2002 in women's athletics